Ruteng is a small town in the highlands towards the western end of Flores Island, Indonesia. It is the administrative capital of Manggarai Regency, serviced by the Frans Sales Lega Airport or Ruteng Airport. The population is predominantly Roman Catholic, but still preserve the ancient Manggarai custom of caci (whip fighting), which is usually practiced at weddings, and serves as a tourist attraction.

The Liang Bua archeological site is nearby, around 10 km to the north of Ruteng.

Climate
Ruteng has a subtropical highland climate (Cfb) that borders the tropical rainforest climate (Af) with moderate rainfall from June to August and heavy to very heavy rainfall in the remaining months.

References

Flores Island (Indonesia)
Regency seats of East Nusa Tenggara
Populated places in East Nusa Tenggara